École nationale supérieure en génie des systèmes et de l'innovation (ENSGSI) a French engineering College created in 1993.

The school trains engineers with in organizational engineering, design engineering, innovation, management of complex projects.

Located in Nancy, the ENSGSI is a public higher education institution. The school is a member of the National Polytechnic Institute of Lorraine.

References

External links
 ENSGSI

Engineering universities and colleges in France
Grandes écoles
Nancy, France
Educational institutions established in 1993
1993 establishments in France